The Vegemite Tales is a comedy theatrical production written by Australian playwright Melanie Tait. The play revolves around the lives of a group of young antipodeans sharing a flat in Hammersmith, west London. It has been described as an Australian stage version of Friends. The name is taken from the iconic Australian food paste, Vegemite.

Background 
The Vegemite Tales was first staged at The Curtain's Up, a small fringe theatre in west London in 2001. It was an overnight sell-out, finding enormous popularity with London's Australian, New Zealand and South African communities.

Contemporary themes include living in a shared house, living in a city far away from home, dealing with different cultures and making the difficult decision to stop putting real life on hold and move back home. It has been reviewed as relying on cliches about living in London.

Cast 

The 2006 season featured Blair McDonough (ex Neighbours and Australian Big Brother). Other cast members have included Jonathon Dutton, Sarah Hadland, Josephine Taylor, Patrick Harvey, Craig Rasmus, Tim Cove, Maxine Morrison, Priscilla Jackman, Dimity Harris, Christa Nicola, Spencer McLaren, Billy Gentle, Felicity Jurd, Justin Segal, Louis Sanchez, and Craig Giovanelli.

Production 
It has run at the Old Red Lion and the Courtyard. In 2005 the show had a 12-week sell-out season at the Riverside Studios, a London arts venue well known for its international theatre programme.

In 2006 the production made its successful West End debut at The Venue (now The Leicester Square Theatre).

In 2007 the production had its second West End season at The Venue from 26 July to 27 October.

The production has been directed by Melanie Tait (2001-2003) and Bill Buckhurst (2004-2007). It has been produced by Andrew Robb (also the actor for the character of Sam).

Over 60,000 people have seen The Vegemite Tales since it was first staged.

References

External links 
 AusStage play listing

Australian plays
2001 plays